French erotic film can refer to:
"French Erotic Film", an animutation featuring the song "Opblaaskrokodil" by Ome Henk
Softcore pornography produced in France
Emmanuelle, a fictional character who has come to symbolize French erotic film
List of French erotic films

Mondegreens